David "Dai" Moses (birth  – 1999) was a Welsh rugby union and professional rugby league footballer who played in the 1940s, 1950s and 1960s, and coached rugby league in the 1960s.

Background
Dai Moses was born in Nant-y-moel, Wales, his birth was registered in Bridgend district, Wales.

Playing career

International honours
Dai Moses won a cap for Wales (RL) while at Swinton in 1959 against France at Stade des Minimes, Toulouse on Sunday 1 March 1959.

County Cup Final appearances
Dai Moses played right-, i.e. number 10, in Swinton's 9-15 defeat by St. Helens in the 1960–61 Lancashire County Cup Final during the 1960–61 season at Central Park, Wigan on Saturday 29 October 1960.

Genealogical information
Dai Moses was the older brother of the rugby union and rugby league footballer; Glyn Moses.

References

External links
Search for "David Moses" at britishnewspaperarchive.co.uk
Search for "Dai Moses" at britishnewspaperarchive.co.uk

1920s births
1999 deaths
Footballers who switched code
Maesteg RFC players
Place of birth missing
Place of death missing
Rugby league locks
Rugby league players from Bridgend County Borough
Rugby league props
Rugby league second-rows
Rugby union players from Bridgend County Borough
Salford Red Devils players
Swinton Lions coaches
Swinton Lions players
Wales national rugby league team players
Welsh rugby league coaches
Welsh rugby league players
Welsh rugby union players